Lisa Gaye Curry AO MBE (born 15 May 1962), also known by her married name Lisa Curry-Kenny, is an Australian former competition swimmer.

Curry won seven gold, two silver and one bronze Commonwealth Games medals, and is the only Australian swimmer to have held Commonwealth and Australian records in every stroke except backstroke. 
Curry was the chair of the National Australia Day Council from 2000 to 2008.

Swimming career
Curry's swimming ability was noticed at a young age and by the age of 12 was one of the fastest swimmers of her age in the world. She was an Australian Institute of Sport scholarship holder, and won 15 national long course open titles.

From 1977 to 1992, Curry represented Australia 16 times. She competed in the 1980, 1984 and 1992 Olympics; the 1978 and 1982 World Championships; and the 1978, 1982 and 1990 Commonwealth Games.

Curry won seven gold medals, two silver medals, and a bronze medal across three Commonwealth Games: a silver medal in the 4×100-metre medley relay at Edmonton in 1978; three gold medals (100-metre butterfly, 200- and 400-metre individual medley) and a bronze (100-metre freestyle) at Brisbane in 1982; and four gold medals (100-metre butterfly, 50-metre freestyle, 4×100-metre freestyle relay, 4×100-metre medley relay) and one silver (100-metre freestyle) at Auckland in 1990.

After retiring from swimming, she competed in surf boat rowing competitions and outrigger canoe events, and her team won the World Championship Outrigger Canoe event in 1997.

Honours
On 31 December 1982, Curry was named a Member of the Order of the British Empire "in recognition of service to the sport of swimming". She was inducted into the Sport Australia Hall of Fame in 1985. At the 1994 Australia Day Honours, Curry was awarded the Medal of the Order of Australia "in recognition of service to the sport of swimming". On 14 July 2000, Curry was awarded the Australian Sports Medal for "her significant contribution as a competitor in swimming". On 1 January 2001, Curry was awarded the Centenary Medal for "service to Australian society through swimming and the National Australia Day Council". At the 2008 Australia Day Honours, Curry was named as an Officer of the Order of Australia "for service to the community through encouraging national pride and identity, particularly through leadership of the National Australia Day Council." In 2009 Curry was inducted into the Queensland Sport Hall of Fame.

Television
In 2011, Curry appeared as a celebrity contestant on the first season of Nine Network's Australian reality series The Celebrity Apprentice Australia. Curry was fired in the 6th task.

She appeared in advertising campaigns for cruise liner P&O Cruises Australia and Uncle Tobys.

In January 2017, Curry was revealed as a celebrity contestant on the third season of Network Ten's Australian reality series I'm a Celebrity...Get Me Out of Here!. On 8 March 2017, Curry was the 9th celebrity eliminated from the series after 41 days in the jungle coming in 6th place.

Curry was the subject of the episode of Who Do You Think You Are? aired on 9 June 2020.

Lisa was the subject of an episode of Australian Story, on the ABC, called The Deep End, which aired in June 2022.

In 2022, Curry appeared on the fourth season of The Masked Singer Australia as  Caterpillar and was the second contestant to be revealed.

Business interests
Curry and former husband Grant Kenny co-own the Curry Kenny Aviation Group, which in 2009 owned approximately 60 aircraft.
Curry has a partnership with Naturopath Jeff Butterworth in the company Happy Healthy YOU, featuring the products Happy Hormones, Happy Greens and Happy Turmeric. Happy Healthy You was launched in Australia in 2015 and has grown into resource for women dealing with hormonal conditions with over 65,000 women following Lisa's advice and taking the health supplements.

Personal life
Curry was married to Grant Kenny, former ironman surf lifesaver and Olympic bronze medallist, in 1986. Curry and Kenny separated in May 2009. They had three children together; Jaimi Lee, Morgan and Jett. Daughter Jaimi Lee Kenny died on 14 September 2020 at age 33, following a long illness.

In 2008 Curry had a heart surgery operation to implant a defibrillator after being found to have an irregular heartbeat as a consequence of a viral infection.

In October 2016, Curry announced her engagement to entertainer Mark Andrew Tabone. They married in May 2018.

See also
 List of Commonwealth Games medallists in swimming (women)

References

External links
 Lisa Curry on Australian Olympics site
 

1962 births
Living people
Swimmers from Brisbane
Australian female butterfly swimmers
Australian female medley swimmers
Australian female freestyle swimmers
Australian Institute of Sport swimmers
Olympic swimmers of Australia
Swimmers at the 1978 Commonwealth Games
Swimmers at the 1982 Commonwealth Games
Swimmers at the 1990 Commonwealth Games
Commonwealth Games gold medallists for Australia
Commonwealth Games silver medallists for Australia
Commonwealth Games bronze medallists for Australia
Officers of the Order of Australia
Australian Members of the Order of the British Empire
Recipients of the Centenary Medal
Recipients of the Australian Sports Medal
Sport Australia Hall of Fame inductees
The Apprentice Australia candidates
Sportswomen from Queensland
Swimmers at the 1980 Summer Olympics
Swimmers at the 1984 Summer Olympics
Swimmers at the 1992 Summer Olympics
Commonwealth Games medallists in swimming
I'm a Celebrity...Get Me Out of Here! (Australian TV series) participants
Medallists at the 1982 Commonwealth Games